The following is a list of notable deaths in March 2021.

Entries for each day are listed alphabetically by surname. A typical entry lists information in the following sequence:
 Name, age, country of citizenship at birth, subsequent country of citizenship (if applicable), reason for notability, cause of death (if known), and reference.

March 2021

1
Flex-Deon Blake, 58, American pornographic actor (Niggas' Revenge).
Sir Alan Bowness, 93, British art historian and art critic, director of the Tate Gallery (1980–1988).
Hauk Buen, 87, Norwegian fiddler.
Frederico Campos, 93, Brazilian politician, governor of Mato Grosso (1979–1983), COVID-19.
Ann Casey, 82, American professional wrestler (GCCW, JCP, WWWF).
Gheorghe Dănilă, 71, Romanian actor.
Ejaz Durrani, 85, Pakistani actor (Shaheed, Lakhon Mein Aik, Heer Ranjha).
Víctor Espinoza Peña, 73, Peruvian politician, mayor of Pucusana District (since 2020), COVID-19.
Emmanuel Félémou, 60, Guinean Roman Catholic prelate, bishop of Kankan (since 2007), COVID-19.
Jahmil French, 29, Canadian actor (Degrassi: The Next Generation, Soundtrack, Remedy).
Fernando Olivié González-Pumariega, 96, Spanish diplomat, ambassador to Paraguay (1970–1973), Colombia (1973–1977) and Yugoslavia (1977–1981).
Bernard Guyot, 75, French Olympic racing cyclist (1964).
Vladimír Heger, 89, Czech basketball player (ATK Praha) and coach (Sparta Praha, Czechoslovakia national team).
Vernon Jordan, 85, American attorney, non-profit executive (National Urban League, UNCF) and civil rights leader.
Kirinji Kazuharu, 67, Japanese sumo wrestler, multiple organ failure.
Boris Kosarev, 69, Belarusian ice hockey player (Traktor Chelyabinsk, HC Dinamo Minsk) and coach (Khimik-SKA Novopolotsk).
Agim Krajka, 83, Albanian composer.
Zlatko Kranjčar, 64, Croatian football player (Dinamo Zagreb, Rapid Wien) and manager (national team).
Pietro Larizza, 85, Italian trade unionist and politician, secretary general of the UIL (1992–2000) and senator (2007–2008).
Lyn Macdonald, 91, British radio producer and military historian.
Stephen Maloney, 60, Australian tennis player.
Theodoros Margellos, 68, Greek businessman.
Jorge Marticorena Cuba, 64, Peruvian politician, mayor of Lurín District (2007–2014, since 2019), COVID-19.
Mary McHenry, 88, American academic.
Max Morton, 78, British-born Belgian painter.
Andrea Nannini, 76, Italian Olympic volleyball player (1976).
János Németh, 87, Hungarian jurist, president of the Constitutional Court (1998–2003).
Rossella Panarese, 60, Italian radio broadcaster (Radio3 Scienza) and scientific divulgator.
Ralph Peterson Jr., 58, American jazz drummer (The Jazz Messengers, Out of the Blue), cancer.
Helena Pietraszkiewicz, 67, Polish politician and psychologist, voivode of Łódź (2006–2007).
Enrique San Francisco, 65, Spanish actor (La mujer del ministro, Navajeros, El pico) and comedian, pneumonia.
Milenko Savović, 60, Serbian basketball player (Partizan, Oximesa, Vojvodina), COVID-19.
David Searle, 85, Canadian politician, Northwest Territories MLA (1967–1979) and speaker (1975–1979), cancer.
Toko Shinoda, 107, Japanese painter.
Ian St John, 82, Scottish Hall of Fame football player (Motherwell, Liverpool, national team) and manager.
Mikhail Studenetsky, 86, Russian basketball player, Olympic silver medallist (1956), COVID-19.
Lise Toubon, 87, French art expert.
Ngai Tupa, 84, Cook Islands politician, MP (2006–2010).
Anatoliy Zlenko, 82, Ukrainian diplomat, minister of foreign affairs (1990–1994, 2000–2003) and permanent representative to the United Nations (1994–1997).

2
Czesław Baran, 83, Polish politician and agronomist, deputy (1985–1989).
Chris Barber, 90, English jazz bandleader and trombonist ("Petite Fleur").
George Bass, 88, American archaeologist, pioneer of underwater archaeology.
Luciano Capicchioni, 74, Sammarinese-American sports agent.
Àlex Casademunt, 39, Spanish pop singer (Operación Triunfo 2001), actor and TV presenter, traffic collision.
Nandkumar Singh Chauhan, 68, Indian politician, MP (1996–2009, since 2014), COVID-19.
Claudio Coccoluto, 58, Italian disc jockey.
Werner Dörflinger, 80, German politician, MP (1980–1998).
Mark Goffeney, 51, American guitarist, fentanyl overdose.
Peter Grosser, 82, German football player (1860 Munich, national team) and manager (SpVgg Unterhaching).
Michael Gudinski, 68, Australian music industry executive, co-founder of Mushroom Records, mixed drug use.
Jim Hodder, 80, Canadian politician, Newfoundland and Labrador MHA (1975–1993, 2003–2007).
Claude Lacroix, 77, French comic book author.
Louise McBee, 96, American politician, member of the Georgia House of Representatives (1993–2005).
Stan Newens, 91, British politician, MP (1964–1970, 1974–1983) and MEP (1984–1999).
Kari Rasmussen, 88, Norwegian actress and singer.
ChoKyun Rha, 87, Korean-born American biotechnologist.
Gil Rogers, 87, American actor (All My Children, Guiding Light).
Carlos Sánchez, 68, Argentine comedian, cancer.
Prabhat Sarma, 85, Indian flutist and singer.
Anna Shuttleworth, 93, English cellist.
Jaroslav Tetiva, 89, Czech basketball player (1960 Olympics, Czechoslovakia national team).
Bunny Wailer, 73, Jamaican reggae singer (Bob Marley and the Wailers) and songwriter ("Electric Boogie"), Grammy winner (1991, 1995, 1997), complications from a stroke.
Edward C. Waller III, 95, American vice admiral.
Ahmad al-Zein, 88, Lebanese Sunni Islam scholar.
Zhou Yulin, 98, Chinese mathematician, member of the Chinese Academy of Sciences.

3
Medea Abrahamyan, 88, Armenian cellist.
Mavis Agbandje-McKenna, 57, Nigerian-born British biophysicist and virologist.
Tomas Altamirano Duque, 87, Panamanian politician, vice president (1994–1999).
Joe Altobelli, 88, American baseball manager (San Francisco Giants, Baltimore Orioles), player (Cleveland Indians) and coach.
Celestino Bonifacio Bacalé, 63, Equatoguinean politician, deputy.
Władysław Baka, 84, Polish economist and PZPR activist, president of the National Bank of Poland (1981–1985, 1989–1991), member of government (1985–1989).
Hans Blumer, 92, Swiss Olympic swimmer (1948).
Byun Hui-su, 23, South Korean soldier. (body discovered on this date)
William P. Cartlidge, 78, English film producer (The Spy Who Loved Me, Moonraker, Consuming Passions).
Marianne Carus, 92, American publisher, founder of Cricket.
Sérgio Eduardo Castriani, 66, Brazilian Roman Catholic prelate, archbishop of Manaus (2012–2019), sepsis.
Bill Collins, 89, British baker, co-developer of the Chorleywood bread process.
Emmett Ripley Cox, 86, American jurist, judge of the U.S. District Court for Southern Alabama (1981–1988) and the U.S. Court of Appeals for the Eleventh Circuit (since 1988).
Jim Crockett Jr., 76, American professional wrestling promoter (Jim Crockett Promotions), three-time president of the NWA, liver and kidney failure from COVID-19.
Nicolás Curiel, 92, Venezuelan stage director and actor.
Sadiq Daba, 69, Nigerian actor (October 1) and broadcaster (Nigerian Television Authority), cancer.
Alan Davis, 82, English Anglican clergyman, Archdeacon of West Cumberland (1996–2004).
Wilhelm Eliassen, 85, Norwegian footballer (Frigg Oslo FK, national team).
István Fehér, 66, Hungarian Olympic wrestler (1980).
Kelly Flynn, 66, American politician, member of the Montana House of Representatives (2011–2019), cancer.
Katharina Gaus, 48, German-Australian immunologist.
Diego Gómez, 84, Spanish radio journalist, COVID-19.
József Gurovits, 92, Hungarian sprint canoer, Olympic bronze medallist (1952).
Duffy Jackson, 67, American jazz drummer, complications from hip surgery.
Pedro Jiménez Galán, 100, Spanish politician, deputy (1977–1979).
Helena Kružíková, 92, Czech actress, Thalia Award recipient.
Kyal Sin, 19, Burmese protester (2021–2022 Myanmar protests), shot.
Jerzy Limon, 70, Polish literary scholar and writer, COVID-19.
Katharina Matz, 85, Czech-born German actress (The Man Who Sold Himself, The Wonderful Years, Maximilian von Mexiko).
Hideshi Miyake, 86, Japanese baseball player.
Richard Olivier, 75, Belgian filmmaker and documentarian.
Nicola Pagett, 75, British actress (Upstairs, Downstairs, Anne of the Thousand Days, There's a Girl in My Soup), brain tumour.
Dagoberto Planos Despaigne, 64, Cuban singer, cirrhosis.
Andrei Polyakov, 70, Russian diplomat, ambassador to Tunisia (2006–2011) and Rwanda (2013–2017).
Earl Renneke, 92, American politician, member of the Minnesota Senate (1969–1993).
Yuri Rozanov, 59, Russian sportscaster (NTV Plus, Match TV).
John Sackett, 76, American politician, member of the Alaska House of Representatives (1967–1971) and Senate (1973–1987).
Edward Sandoval, 74, American politician, member of the New Mexico House of Representatives (1983–2015).
Ruy Scarpino, 59, Brazilian football manager (Imperatriz, Ceará, Ituano), COVID-19.
Donald J. Summers, 69, American particle physicist.
Jonathan Temm, 58, New Zealand lawyer, president of the New Zealand Law Society (2010–2013), Queen's Counsel (since 2019).
Eli Timoner, 92, American businessman, founder of Air Florida, assisted suicide.
Guerdon Trueblood, 87, Costan Rican-born American screenwriter (Jaws 3-D, Sole Survivor, The Candy Snatchers).

4
Kamal Amer, 78, Egyptian politician and military officer, governor of Matrouh (1997–1999) and Aswan (1999–2001), senator (2012–2013), COVID-19.
Karima Brown, 54, South African radio broadcaster (Radio 702) and journalist, COVID-19.
Alan Cartwright, 75, English rock bassist (Procol Harum), stomach cancer.
Colby Chandler, 95, American executive, CEO of Kodak (1983–1990).
Phil Chisnall, 78, English footballer (Manchester United, Liverpool, Southend United).
Marcel Courthiade, 67, French linguist.
DJ Adviser, Ghanaian disc jockey (Happy FM).
Osman Erbaş, 58, Turkish military officer, helicopter crash.
Barbara Ess, 73, American photographer and musician (Disband, Y Pants).
Sarah Everard, 33, British marketing executive, strangled.
Francis Van den Eynde, 74, Belgian politician, member of the Chamber of Representatives (1991–2000).
Majid Fakhry, 97–98, Lebanese philosopher and academic.
Sir Leslie Fielding, 88, British diplomat.
Walter Gretzky, 82, Canadian ice hockey coach, complications from a hip injury.
Paulette Guinchard-Kunstler, 71, French politician, deputy (1997–2001, 2002–2007), assisted suicide.
Zygmunt Hanusik, 76, Polish Olympic cyclist (1968).
Tony Hendra, 79, British comedian and actor (This Is Spinal Tap), complications from amyotrophic lateral sclerosis.
Hossain Toufique Imam, 82, Bangladeshi political advisor, kidney disease.
Hugh Newell Jacobsen, 91, American architect.
Louis Jensen, 77, Danish writer.
Atanasije Jevtić, 83, Serbian Orthodox hierarch, bishop of Zahumlje and Herzegovina (1992–1999), COVID-19.
Johannes Kert, 61, Estonian politician and military officer, commander of the Estonian Defence Forces (1996–2000).
Yuguda Hassan Kila, 70, Nigerian politician, member of the House of Representatives (since 2015).
Donald Kinney, 63, Canadian politician, New Brunswick MLA (1999–2003), cancer.
Heinz Klevenow Jr., 80, German actor (Entlassen auf Bewährung, Chingachgook, die große Schlange).
Gerald Kogan, 87, American jurist, justice (1987–1998) and chief justice (1996–1998) of the Supreme Court of Florida.
František Lízna, 79, Czech Jesuit priest, recipient of the Order of Tomáš Garrigue Masaryk, COVID-19.
Moses McCormick, 39, American polyglot, heart disease.
Paul McMullen, 49, American Olympic middle-distance runner (1996), skiing accident.
Bhaskar Menon, 86, Indian-born American music industry executive, chairman and CEO of EMI Worldwide.
Mark Pavelich, 63, American ice hockey player (New York Rangers), Olympic champion (1980), suicide by asphyxiation.
Martin van de Pol, 56, Dutch criminal, shot.
Andrew Porter, 75, British historian.
Colin Robinson, 58, Trinidadian activist and writer, colon cancer.
David Schindler, 80, American-Canadian limnologist.
Chris Schultz, 61, Canadian football player (Toronto Argonauts, Dallas Cowboys) and sportscaster (TSN), heart attack.
Tengiz Sichinava, 48, Georgian football player (Dinamo Batumi, national team) and manager (Gagra).
Jimmy Spratt, 69, Northern Irish politician, MLA (2007–2015).
Jonathan Steinberg, 86, American-born British historian.
Marat Tarasov, 90, Russian poet and translator.
Willie Whigham, 81, Scottish footballer (Albion Rovers, Falkirk, Middlesbrough), pneumonia.
Helmut Winschermann, 100, German classical oboist and composer.
Azad Zaman, 47, Indian politician, Meghalaya MLA (since 2018), cardiac arrest.

5
Michèle Angirany, 95, French Olympic cross country skier (1952).
Robert Ashby, 95, American fighter pilot (Tuskegee Airmen).
Étienne Flaubert Batangu Mpesa, 78, Congolese pharmacist and scientific researcher, pancreatic cancer.
Jerzy Boniecki, 87, Polish Olympic swimmer (1952).
Nicolas Bwakira, 79, Burundian diplomat.
Chuang Ling-yun, 21, Taiwanese singer and actress, suicide by jumping.
Buddy Colt, 85, American professional wrestler and pilot.
Patrick Dupond, 61, French dancer (Paris Opera Ballet).
Paul Foster, 89, American playwright, founding member of the La MaMa Experimental Theatre Club.
Martin Freeth, 76, British filmmaker, cancer.
Henri Gaudin, 87, French architect.
Don Gile, 85, American baseball player (Boston Red Sox).
Enrique González Rojo Jr., 92, Mexican writer and philosopher.
Vilém Holáň, 82, Czech politician, minister of defense (1994–1996).
Cecil Jacobson, 84, American gynecologist and convicted fraudster.
Bandula Jayasekara, 60, Sri Lankan diplomat and journalist, blood cancer.
Yevgeny Kadyaykin, 92, Kazakhstani Olympic middle-distance runner (1956).
Frank J. Kelley, 96, American politician, attorney general of Michigan (1961–1999).
Sasa Klaas, 27, Botswanan singer-songwriter, helicopter crash.
Mickey Lewis, 56, English footballer (West Bromwich Albion, Derby County, Oxford United), cancer.
Stig Malm, 79, Swedish trade unionist, chairman of LO (1983–1993), COVID-19.
Margarita Maslennikova, 92, Russian cross-country skier, world champion (1954).
David Matthews, 78–79, British academic and translator.
Paolo Moreno, 86, Italian archaeologist.
M. G. George Muthoot, 71, Indian conglomerate executive, chairman of The Muthoot Group (since 1993), fall.
Pavel Oliva, 97, Czech classical philologist and Holocaust survivor.
Mo Pinel, 78, American mechanical engineer and product designer, complications from COVID-19.
Birgitta Rasmusson, 81, Swedish television personality and cookbook author.
Ann Riordan, 73, Irish businesswoman.
Janet Sawbridge, 73–74, British ice dancer.
Gerda Schmidt-Panknin, 100, German painter.
Samuel J. Scott, 82, American engineer.
Harold S. Shapiro, 92, American mathematician.
José Carlos da Silva Júnior, 94, Brazilian businessman and politician, senator (1996–1999) and vice-governor of Paraíba (1983–1986), COVID-19.
Aulis Sipponen, 92, Finnish Olympic skier (1952).
Francis Small, 75, New Zealand civil engineer and scouting leader, president of IPENZ (1996–1997).
Michael Stanley, 72, American rock guitarist, singer and songwriter, lung cancer.
Czesława Stopka, 83, Polish Olympic cross-country skier (1964).
Suna Tanaltay, 87, Turkish poet and psychologist.
Adelio Terraroli, 89, Italian politician, deputy (1968–1979).
Carlo Tognoli, 82, Italian politician, mayor of Milan (1976–1986), deputy (1987–1994), MEP (1984–1987), COVID-19.
Anton Urban, 87, Slovak football player (Slovan Bratislava, Wacker Innsbruck) and manager (Petržalka), Olympic silver medallist (1964).

6
Bengt Åberg, 76, Swedish motocross racer.
Franco Acosta, 25, Uruguayan footballer (Fénix, Villarreal B, Plaza Colonia), drowned.
David Bailie, 83, South African-born English actor (Pirates of the Caribbean, The House That Jack Built, Doctor Who).
Katja Behrens, 78, German author and translator.
Joaquin Bernas, 88, Filipino Jesuit priest, lawyer and writer, member of the Constitutional Commission (1986) and president of the Ateneo de Manila University (1984–1993).
N. S. Lakshminarayan Bhat, 84, Indian poet.
Martin Boykan, 89, American composer.
Chi Shangbin, 71, Chinese football player (national team) and manager (Dalian Wanda, Dalian Aerbin), heart attack.
Ned Cleary, 90, Irish Gaelic football player (Castlehaven) and coach.
Renée Doria, 100, French opera singer.
Jude Patrick Dougherty, 90, American philosopher.
Ben Farrales, 88, Filipino fashion designer.
Yehia El-Gamal, Egyptian pediatrician and immunologist.
Abdul Ghani Gilong, 88, Malaysian politician, MP (1969–1978), minister of works (1972–1974, 1976–1978) and transport (1970–1971).
Sir Jeremiah Harman, 90, English jurist, cancer.
Wilhelmina Holladay, 98, American art collector and patron.
Cassius Ionescu-Tulcea, 97, Romanian-American mathematician.
Boris Komnenić, 63, Serbian actor (Days of Dreams, Loving Glances, Seven and a Half).
Todd R. Klaenhammer, 69, American food scientist and microbiologist.
Konrad Kornek, 84, Polish footballer (Odra Opole, national team).
Valentin Kurbatov, 81, Russian literary critic and writer.
Orlando Lansdorf, 55, Dutch drag queen and HIV activist.
M. Mahadevappa, 83, Indian agricultural scientist and plant breeder.
Pierre Maraval, 84, French historian.
Katsuaki Matsumoto, 92, Japanese racing cyclist, lymphoma.
Allan J. McDonald, 83, American aerospace engineer, fall.
Herbert Meneses, 81, Guatemalan actor (Sólo de noche vienes, The Silence of Neto).
Miguel Miranda, 54, Peruvian football player (Sporting Cristal, Universitario, national team) and manager.
Shrikant Moghe, 91, Indian actor (Sinhasan, Gammat Jammat).
Tom Moloughney, 80, Irish hurler (Kilruane MacDonagh's, Tipperary).
Pedro Novoa, 46, Peruvian writer and educator, colon cancer.
Bill O'Connor, 94, American football player (Toronto Argonauts).
Lou Ottens, 94, Dutch engineer (Philips), inventor of the cassette tape.
Graham Pink, 91, English nurse and whistleblower.
Carmel Quinn, 95, Irish-American actress and singer, pneumonia.
Sawsan Rabie, 59, Egyptian actress, COVID-19.
Nikki van der Zyl, 85, German voice-over artist (James Bond films), stroke.
Egil A. Wyller, 95, Norwegian philosopher and historian.

7
Mordechai Bar-On, 92, Israeli historian and politician, member of the Knesset (1984–1986).
Dmitri Bashkirov, 89, Russian pianist.
Wiesław Bocheński, 77, Polish Olympic freestyle wrestler (1968).
Fabio Brunelli, 51, Brazilian news anchor, journalist and writer, cancer.
Thaddeus M. Buczko, 95, American politician, Massachusetts state auditor (1964–1981).
Joketani Cokanasiga, 84, Fijian politician, minister for public works and energy (2000–2001).
Bob Curtis, 88, American politician, member of the Washington House of Representatives (1971–1977).
Olivier Dassault, 69, French politician and aerospace executive, deputy (1988–1997, since 2002), helicopter crash.
Paul Devlin, 74, Canadian curler.
Andreana Družina, 101, Slovenian political commissar and partisan, People's Hero of Yugoslavia.
Duggie Fields, 75, British artist.
Stone Foltz, 20, American student and hazing victim, alcohol intoxication.
Georges Gruillot, 89, French politician, senator (1988–2008).
Janis Hape, 62, American Olympic swimmer (1976).
Sanja Ilić, 69, Serbian composer ("Nova deca") and keyboardist (San, Balkanika), COVID-19.
Gene Kennedy, 93, American politician, member of the Iowa House of Representatives (1969–1971) and Senate (1971–1975).
Josky Kiambukuta, 72, Congolese singer (TPOK Jazz).
Janice McLaughlin, 79, American Roman Catholic nun and human rights activist.
Nwali Sylvester Ngwuta, 69, Nigerian jurist, justice of the Supreme Court (since 2011).
*Oishi Matashichi, 87, Japanese fisherman and anti-nuclear activist, pneumonia.
Olga Orman, 77, Dutch-Aruban writer and poet.
Mirko Pavinato, 86, Italian footballer (Bologna, Vicenza), kidney problems aggravated by COVID-19.
Lars-Göran Petrov, 49, Swedish heavy metal singer (Entombed, Entombed A.D., Firespawn), bile duct cancer.
Maganti Ramji, 37, Indian film producer (Tuneega Tuneega), stroke.
Yechezkel Roth, 85, Romanian-born American rabbi, heart attack.
Charles Scontras, 91, American historian.
Carl J. Shapiro, 108, American businessman and philanthropist, director of VF Corporation (1971–1976).
Nikolay Smorchkov, 90, Russian actor (True Friends, The Cranes Are Flying, A Cruel Romance), COVID-19.
Frank Thorne, 90, American comic book writer (Red Sonja).
Albert Vallvé, 75, Spanish lawyer and politician, senator (1993–1996).
Jack Welborn, 88, American politician, member of the Michigan House of Representatives (1973–1974) and Michigan Senate (1975–1982, 1985–1994).

8
Risto Aaltonen, 81, Finnish actor (Leikkikalugangsteri, Crime and Punishment, Uuno Turhapuro muuttaa maalle).
Josip Alebić, 74, Croatian Olympic sprinter (1972, 1976, 1980).
Ronaldo Aquino, 59, Filipino politician, mayor of Calbayog (since 2011), shot.
Kuryana Azis, 69, Indonesian politician, regent of Ogan Komering Ulu (since 2015), COVID-19.
Clinton Ballou, 97, American biochemist and academic.
Adrian Bărar, 61, Romanian guitarist and composer (Cargo), COVID-19.
Joey Benjamin, 60, English cricketer (Warwickshire, Surrey, national team), heart attack.
Tom Bland, 83, American football player (Wheeling Ironmen, Orlando Panthers, Toronto Argonauts).
Hervé Cassan, 74, French diplomat and professor.
Cepillín, 75, Mexican clown, TV host and actor, complications from spinal surgery.
Rhéal Cormier, 53, Canadian baseball player (St. Louis Cardinals, Boston Red Sox, Philadelphia Phillies), pancreatic cancer.
Leon Gast, 85, American documentary filmmaker (When We Were Kings, The Grateful Dead Movie), Oscar winner (1997).
Genésio Goulart, 66, Brazilian politician, Santa Catarina MLA (2003–2011) and mayor of Tubarão (1997–2000), degenerative disease.
Keith Greene, 83, British racing driver (Formula One) and team owner, cardiac arrest.
Norton Juster, 91, American author (The Phantom Tollbooth, The Dot and the Line, The Hello, Goodbye Window), complications from a stroke.
Kind, 19, Irish racehorse, complications from foaling.
Lee Ji-eun, 49, South Korean actress (Emperor of the Sea).
Catherine Macleod, 72, Scottish-born Canadian writer.
Alan Marnoch, 75, Scottish-born Australian soccer player (Sydney Hakoah, Australia national team).
Danny McAlinden, 73, Northern Irish boxer.
Fergal McCann, 47, Irish Gaelic football coach (Tyrone).
Terrence F. McVerry, 77, American politician and jurist, member of the Pennsylvania House of Representatives (1979–1990) and judge of the U.S. District Court for Western Pennsylvania (since 2002), complications from a fall.
Stanislav Meleiko, 84, Russian television presenter and journalist.
Djibril Tamsir Niane, 89, Guinean writer and historian, COVID-19.
Rasim Öztekin, 62, Turkish actor (Düğün Dernek, For Love and Honor, G.O.R.A.), heart disease.
Rafael Palmero Ramos, 84, Spanish Roman Catholic prelate, bishop of Palencia (1996–2006) and Orihuela-Alicante (2006–2012), complications from cancer and COVID-19.
Trevor Peacock, 89, English actor (The Vicar of Dibley, Hamlet, Fred Claus), complications from dementia.
Roman Pokora, 73, Ukrainian football player (Karpaty Lviv, Spartak Ivano-Frankivsk) and manager (Simurq PIK).
Bill Searcey, 63, American football player (San Diego Chargers), pancreatic cancer.
Norm Sherry, 89, American baseball player (Los Angeles Dodgers, New York Mets) and manager (California Angels).
Anshuman Singh, 85, Indian politician and jurist, governor of Gujarat (1998–1999) and Rajasthan (1999–2003), COVID-19.
Mark Whitecage, 83, American jazz reedist.
Julien-François Zbinden, 103, Swiss composer and jazz pianist.

9
Adnan Abdallat, 78, Jordanian neurologist, complications from COVID-19.
Joan Walsh Anglund, 95, American children's author.
Agustín Balbuena, 75, Argentine footballer (Colón de Santa Fe, Independiente).
Boston Harbor, 27, American Thoroughbred racehorse.
Micky Brown, 76, English footballer (Millwall, Colchester United).
Margarita Darbinyan, 100, Armenian historian and translator.
Richard Driehaus, 78, American fund manager and philanthropist.
Federico Fabregat, 46, Mexican visual artist, writer and musician.
Hans-Christian Gabrielsen, 53, Norwegian trade unionist, leader of the Norwegian Confederation of Trade Unions (since 2017), heart failure.
Bob Graves, 78, English footballer (Lincoln City).
Daniel Hillel, 90, Israeli-American agronomist.
Rafet Husović, 56, Montenegrin politician, deputy prime minister (2012–2020).
Jhon Jarrín, 59, Ecuadorian Olympic cyclist (1980), traffic collision.
Walter LaFeber, 87, American historian.
James Levine, 77, American conductor and pianist (Metropolitan Opera).
Marino Lombardo, 70, Italian footballer (Torino, Cesena, Pistoiese), heart attack.
Erling Lorentzen, 98, Norwegian shipowner and industrialist, founder of Aracruz Celulose.
Carlos Matallanas, 39, Spanish sports journalist and writer, complications from amyotrophic lateral sclerosis.
Michael McDermott, 67, American politician.
Biff McGuire, 94, American actor (The Thomas Crown Affair, Serpico, Gibbsville).
Alec Monteath, 79, Scottish actor (Take the High Road).
Roger Mudd, 93, American broadcast journalist (Meet the Press, NBC Nightly News), complications from kidney failure.
Shuichi Murakami, 70, Japanese jazz drummer.
Steve Ortmayer, 77, American football coach and executive (San Diego Chargers, Los Angeles Rams).
Sir Richard Pease, 3rd Baronet, 98, British banker.
John Polkinghorne, 90, English theoretical physicist, theologian and Anglican priest.
Léo Rosa, 37, Brazilian actor (Vidas Opostas), testicular cancer.
Adhemar Santillo, 81, Brazilian politician, deputy (1975–1986) and mayor of Anápolis (1986–1989, 1997–2001), pulmonary embolism from COVID-19.
Cliff Simon, 58, South African-born American actor (Stargate SG-1), kiteboarding accident.
Len Skeat, 84, English jazz double-bassist.
Jim Snyder, 88, American baseball player (Minnesota Twins) and manager (Seattle Mariners).
Steven Spurrier, 79, British wine merchant and writer.
Josy Stoffel, 92, Luxembourgian Olympic gymnast (1948, 1952, 1956, 1960, 1964).
René Taesch, 69, French photographer, musician and writer, cancer.
Tommy Troelsen, 80, Danish footballer, Olympic silver medalist (1960) and television presenter.
Blanquita Valenti, 87, American politician.
Isela Vega, 81, Mexican actress (Bring Me the Head of Alfredo Garcia), screenwriter and film director, cancer.
María de Jesús Velarde, 95, Spanish nun.
Jiří Ventruba, 71, Czech neurosurgeon and politician, deputy (since 2017), COVID-19.
Anthony Watson, 80, American Olympic long jumper (1960).
Marina Zerova, 86, Ukrainian entomologist.

10
Bruce Abel, 84, American bass singer.
Mirko Bazić, 82, Croatian football player (NK Metalac Zagreb, NK Nehaj) and manager (Dinamo Zagreb).
Mario Boccalatte, 87, Italian footballer (Biellese, Reggiana).
Hamed Bakayoko, 56, Ivorian politician, prime minister (since 2020), cancer.
Joan Burt, 91, Canadian architect.
Dharamchand Chordia, 71, Indian politician, Maharashtra MLA.
Bob Desjarlais, 66, Canadian trade unionist.
Dick Duckett, 87, American basketball player (Cincinnati Royals).
Hélio Fernandes, 100, Brazilian journalist.
János Gonda, 89, Hungarian jazz pianist.
Eugene Hughes, 86, American educator, president of Northern Arizona University and Wichita State University.
Per Kleppe, 97, Norwegian politician, minister of trade and shipping (1971–1972), Nordic cooperation (1971–1972) and finance (1973–1979).
Lee Chiong Giam, 79, Singaporean diplomat, high commissioner to Papua New Guinea (1982–1999) and Pakistan (2006–2014), ambassador to East Timor (2005–2014), complications from a fall.
Richard Lind, 98, Malaysian civil servant.
Lyudmila Lyadova, 95, Russian composer and singer, People's Artist of the RSFSR (1984), COVID-19.
Henri-Thomas Lokondo, 65, Congolese politician, MP (since 2006), COVID-19.
Chris Mann, 72, South African poet, cancer.
Robert Middlekauff, 91, American historian, complications from a stroke.
Ali Mahdi Muhammad, 82, Somali politician, president (1991–1997), COVID-19.
Ron Phoenix, 91, English footballer (Manchester City, Rochdale).
Scott Pilarz, 61, American Jesuit academic administrator, president of Marquette University (2011–2013) and the University of Scranton (2003–2011, since 2017), complications from amyotrophic lateral sclerosis.
Albert Resis, 99, American historian and writer.
Henryk Rozmiarek, 72, Polish handball player, Olympic bronze medalist (1976).
Manuel Saturnino da Costa, 78, Bissau-Guinean politician, prime minister (1994–1997).
Marco Sciaccaluga, 67, Italian theatre director.
Stephen Scott, 76, American composer.
Joe Tait, 83, American sportscaster (Cleveland Cavaliers, Cleveland Indians, Cleveland Rockers).
Veaceslav Țurcan, 55, Moldovan human rights activist, COVID-19.
Tomás Vidiella, 83, Chilean film director and actor, complications from COVID-19.
Robert-Rudolf Volk, 100, Estonian sculptor.
David Wolfson, Baron Wolfson of Sunningdale, 85, British retail executive and politician, Downing Street chief of staff (1979–1985), member of the House of Lords (1991–2017), complications of dementia.

11
Mauro Aparecido dos Santos, 66, Brazilian Roman Catholic prelate, archbishop of Cascavel (since 2007), COVID-19.
Ray Campi, 86, American rock double bassist.
Mahmud Us Samad Chowdhury, 66, Bangladeshi politician, MP (since 2014), COVID-19.
Carola B. Eisenberg, 103, Argentine-American psychiatrist.
Jewlia Eisenberg, 50, American singer (Charming Hostess), GATA2 deficiency.
Lin Emery, 94, American visual artist.
Petar Fajfrić, 79, Serbian handball player and coach, Olympic champion (1972), COVID-19.
Serge Giacchini, 89, French Olympic bobsledder (1956).
Florentín Giménez, 95, Paraguayan pianist and composer, COVID-19.
Sally Grossman, 81, American music label executive (Bearsville Records).
Peter W. Hall, 72, American jurist, judge of the U.S. Court of Appeals for the Second Circuit (since 2004), cancer.
Francis Hardy, 97, French politician, deputy (1973–1981, 1986–1988) and mayor of Cognac (1979–2001).
Archie Lang, 72, Canadian politician, Yukon MLA (2002–2011), cancer.
Victor Lebedev, 86, Russian composer (Heavenly Swallows, Be My Husband, Gardes-Marines, Ahead!), People's Artist of Russia (2005).
Orlando Llenza, 90, Puerto Rican military officer.
Curtis Lovejoy, 63, American swimmer, Paralympic champion (2000), blood cancer.
Isidore Mankofsky, 89, American cinematographer (The Muppet Movie, Somewhere in Time, The Jazz Singer).
Donald McDonnell, 87, Australian Olympic boxer (1952)
Skip Mercier, 66, American set designer, pancreatic cancer.
Takis Mousafiris, 84, Greek Aromanian composer and songwriter, cancer.
Luis Palau, 86, Argentine-born American evangelist, lung cancer.
Peter Patzak, 76, Austrian film director (Kassbach – Ein Porträt, Wahnfried, Shanghai 1937) and screenwriter.
Ernesto Ráez Mendiola, 84, Peruvian stage director, actor and theater teacher.
George Reihner, 65, American football player (Houston Oilers).
Jack Sandner, 79, American business executive (Chicago Mercantile Exchange), stroke.
Jimmy Stevenson, 74, Scottish footballer (Hibernian, Southend United, Margate).
Maenoyama Tarō, 76, Japanese sumo wrestler.
Norman J. Warren, 78, English film director (Satan's Slave, Prey, Terror).
Hirotaro Yamazaki, 79, Japanese politician, member of the House of Representatives (1993–1996) and mayor of Fukuoka (1998–2006), intracerebral hemorrhage.
Zin Mar Oo, 51, Burmese actress (Sone Yay).

12
Andrés Abt, 47, Uruguayan politician, deputy (2020), COVID-19.
Austen Angell, 87, Australian-born American physical chemist, cancer.
Robina Asti, 99, American flight instructor and advocate for women's and transgender rights.
Gérard Aygoui, 84, French footballer (Olympique de Marseille, national team).
Fatima Aziz, 47, Afghan physician and politician, MP (since 2005), cancer.
Miodrag Baletić, 72, Montenegrin basketball coach (Sutjeska, Budućnost, Željezničar Sarajevo).
Gaynor Cawley, 79, American politician, member of the Pennsylvania House of Representatives (1981–2006), cancer.
*Chao Kuang Piu, 100, Hong Kong textile executive and philanthropist, founder of Dragonair.
Nicolae Dabija, 72, Moldovan writer, literary historian and politician, MP (1990–1994, 1998–2001), COVID-19.
Ronald DeFeo Jr., 69, American mass murderer, basis for The Amityville Horror.
Ademar Frederico Duwe, 82, Brazilian politician, Santa Catarina MLA (1987–1991).
Daphne Gail Fautin, 74, American professor of invertebrate zoology.
Uruguay Graffigna, 73, Uruguayan-Chilean footballer (San Luis de Quillota, Los Angeles Aztecs, PEC Zwolle), complications from COVID-19 and Alzheimer's disease.
Ferdi Hartzenberg, 85, South African politician, leader of the opposition (1993–1994), minister of education and training (1979–1982).
Khairuddin Haseeb, 91, Iraqi journalist.
Chang Sik Kim, 77, South Korean-American Buddhist monk, creator of Shim Gum Do.
Andrew Majda, 72, American mathematician.
Noxolo Maqashalala, 44, South African actress. (body discovered on this date)
Avenal McKinnon, 71, New Zealand art historian and writer, director of the New Zealand Portrait Gallery (2005–2014).
Irina Vasilevna Medvedeva, 62, Russian scientist.
John Albert Nordberg, 94, American jurist, judge of the U.S. District Court for Northern Illinois (since 1982).
Dion Payton, 70, American blues guitarist and singer.
Stahan Rakhimov, 83, Uzbek singer, People's Artist of Russia (2002).
Daniell Revenaugh, 86, American pianist.
Roei Sadan, 39, Israeli cyclist, traffic collision.
Tapan Sarkar, 72, Indian-American electrical engineer and academic (Syracuse University).
Ivo Trumbić, 85, Croatian water polo player, Olympic champion (1968) and coach (Netherlands national team).
Bob Walkup, 84, American politician, mayor of Tucson (1999–2011), pulmonary fibrosis.
Dwight Waller, 75, American basketball player (Atlanta Hawks).
Zhou Youyuan, 82, Chinese astrophysicist, member of the Chinese Academy of Sciences.
Goodwill Zwelithini, 72, South African royal, King of the Zulus (since 1971), complications from COVID-19.

13
Rostyslav Bahdasarov, 27, Ukrainian footballer (Kolos Kovaliva, Stal Dniprodzerzhynsk), heart disease.
Josep Anton Codina Olivé, 88, Spanish theatre director.
Igor Cornelissen, 85, Dutch journalist.
Bob Davis, 93, American college basketball coach (Georgetown Tigers, Auburn Tigers).
Jean-Claude Fasquelle, 90, French publisher.
Silvio Favero, 54, Brazilian politician and lawyer, Mato Grosso MLA (since 2019), COVID-19.
Daniela Figueredo, 19, Venezuelan inmate, shot.
Giovanni Gastel, 65, Italian photographer, COVID-19.
Marvelous Marvin Hagler, 66, American Hall of Fame boxer, undisputed middleweight champion (1980–1987).
Sir David Hull, 88, British paediatrician.
Martin Johnson, 71, English sports journalist (The Independent, The Daily Telegraph, The Sunday Times).
Obren Joksimović, 68, Serbian politician, minister of health (2001), COVID-19.
Mark Lubotsky, 89, Russian violinist.
Roger Maes, 77, Belgian Olympic volleyball player (1968), COVID-19.
Carole McCartney, 55–56, US-born Cypriot archeologist.
Bob McPhee, 65, Canadian arts administrator, CEO of Calgary Opera (1998–2017), cancer.
Menzi Ngubane, 56, South African actor (Generations, Yizo Yizo, How to Steal 2 Million), kidney disease.
Kiyoko Ono, 85, Japanese gymnast and politician, Olympic bronze medallist (1964) and member of the House of Councillors (1986–2007), COVID-19.
Nikola Spiridonov, 83, Bulgarian chess grandmaster.
Rocky Thompson, 81, American professional golfer, complications from Alzheimer's disease.
Erol Toy, 84, Turkish novelist.
Murray Walker, 97, British motorsport commentator (BBC Sport, Channel 4, ITV Sport).
Wang Fuchun, 77, Chinese photographer.
Dave Watson, 79, American football player (Boston Patriots).

14
H. Douglas Barclay, 88, American politician and diplomat, member of the New York State Senate (1965–1984), ambassador to El Salvador (2003–2006).
Clark M. Blatteis, 88, German-American physiologist.
Aurora Cornu, 89, Romanian-born French writer, film director and actress (Claire's Knee, Love in the Afternoon).
Jean-Louis Coustillet, 78, French football player and coach (ES Viry-Châtillon, Troyes AC).
Ray Cullen, 79, Canadian ice hockey player (Minnesota North Stars, Vancouver Canucks, Detroit Red Wings).
Henry Darrow, 87, American actor (The High Chaparral, The Hitcher, Zorro).
Ted Daryll, 81, American songwriter.
Frankie de la Cruz, 37, Dominican baseball player (Detroit Tigers, San Diego Padres, Milwaukee Brewers), heart attack.
Lester Francel, 70, Colombian Olympic weightlifter (1972).
Jean Frydman, 95, French resistance member.
Helena Fuchsová, 55, Czech Olympic runner (1996, 2000), cancer.
Māris Grīnblats, 66, Latvian politician, deputy (1991–2010) and minister of education (1995–1997).
Michael Gunder, 67, New Zealand urban planner.
S. P. Jananathan, 61, Indian film director (Iyarkai, Peranmai, Laabam) and screenwriter, cardiac arrest.
Khant Nyar Hein, 17, Burmese activist, shot.
Mahmoud Khoshnam, 85, Iranian music critic.
Iona McGregor, 92, Scottish author.
Monty Meth, 95, British journalist (Daily Mail).
Friedrich Meyer-Oertel, 84, German opera director.
Laxman Pai, 95, Indian painter.
Robert A. Pascal, 86, Canadian-American football player (Montreal Alouettes, Duke Blue Devils, Baltimore Colts) and politician, member of the Maryland Senate (1971–1974).
Paul Ri Moun-hi, 85, South Korean Roman Catholic prelate, archbishop of Daegu (1986–2007).
Marvin Scott, 26, American inmate, homicide.
Thione Seck, 66, Senegalese singer and musician (Orchestra Baobab, Raam Daan).
Rusty Tillman, 75, American football player (Washington Redskins) and coach (Seattle Seahawks, Minnesota Vikings).
Francesco Trabucco, 76, Italian architect and designer, five-time winner of the Compasso d'Oro.
Coot Veal, 88, American baseball player (Detroit Tigers, Washington Senators, Pittsburgh Pirates), neuropathy.
Jean-Jacques Viton, 87, French poet.
Suzanne Zimmerman, 95, American swimmer, Olympic silver medalist (1948).

15
Michel Alberganti, 65, French radio producer and writer, cancer.
Masahiro Anzai, 66, Japanese voice actor (Dragon Ball Z: Fusion Reborn), heart failure.
Neil Ashcroft, 82, British-born American solid-state physicist.
Desmond Barker, 71, South African Air Force officer, plane crash.
Stephen Bechtel Jr., 95, American construction executive and civil engineer, co-owner of the Bechtel Corporation.
Chai Kim Sen, 57, Malaysian politician, senator (2014–2020), cancer.
Jim Dornan, 73, Northern Irish obstetrician and gynecologist, COVID-19.
Dragoljub Đuričić, 68, Montenegrin drummer (YU Grupa, Leb i sol, Kerber), COVID-19.
Daniel Eon, 81, French footballer (Nantes, national team).
Les Fresholtz, 89, American sound mixer (All the President's Men, Bird, Lethal Weapon), Oscar winner (1977, 1989).
Gilmar Fubá, 45, Brazilian footballer (Corinthians), bone marrow cancer.
David Edwin Harrell, 91, American historian and biographer.
Hendrik Hart, 85, Dutch-Canadian philosopher.
Frances Degen Horowitz, 88, American developmental psychiatrist.
Calvin Jackson, 48, American football player (Miami Dolphins, Birmingham Thunderbolts).
Alan Kane, 75, Irish Gaelic footballer (St Joseph's, Aodh Ruadh, Donegal).
Yaphet Kotto, 81, American actor (Live and Let Die, Alien, Homicide: Life on the Street).
Gerard Alfons Kusz, 81, Polish Roman Catholic prelate, auxiliary bishop of Opole (1985–1992) and Gliwice (1992–2014).
Anton Medan, 63, Indonesian gambling tycoon and Islamic preacher, stroke and diabetes.
Chemancheri Kunhiraman Nair, 104, Indian Kathakali actor.
Yasuo Ōtsuka, 89, Japanese animator (The White Snake Enchantress, Alakazam the Great, The Wonderful World of Puss 'n Boots).
Doug Parkinson, 74, Australian pop and rock singer ("Dear Prudence", Fanny Adams, The Life Organisation).
Chester Porter, 95, Australian barrister.
Michel Rabreau, 83, French politician, deputy (1968–1978).
Henri Rancoule, 88, French rugby union player (FC Lourdes, national team).
Paloma Rodríguez, 64, Spanish politician, deputy (2012–2015).
Yuri Shikunov, 81, Russian football player (Torpedo Taganrog, SKA Rostov-on-Don) and manager (Rostov).
Barry Sinervo, 60, Canadian-born American behavioral ecologist and evolutionary biologist, cancer.
Daniel Vachez, 74, French politician, deputy (1997–2002), mayor of Noisiel (1980–2017).
Ian Waddell, 78, Scottish-born Canadian politician, MP (1979–1993), MLA (1996–2001).

16
Moudud Ahmed, 80, Bangladeshi politician, prime minister (1988–1989), vice president (1989–1990) and MP (1979–1982, 1986–1996, 2001–2006).
Sir Courtney Blackman, 88, Barbadian economist and diplomat.
Kevin Bradshaw, 63, Australian Olympic racing cyclist (1980).
Emma C. Chappell, 80, American activist, founder of the United Bank of Philadelphia.
Micky Dulin, 85, English footballer (Tottenham Hotspur).
Amaranth Ehrenhalt, 93, American painter, sculptor and writer, COVID-19.
Timur Faizutdinov, 19, Russian ice hockey player (HC Dinamo Saint Petersburg), cranial injury.
Mauro Favilla, 87, Italian politician, senator (1987–1996) and mayor of Lucca (1972–1984, 1988, 2007–2012), COVID-19.
Ombretta Fumagalli Carulli, 77, Italian politician, deputy (1987–1996) and senator (1996–2001).
Aarón Gamal, 62, Mexican footballer (Deportivo Neza, Tigres, national team), heart disease.
Líviusz Gyulai, 83, Romanian-born Hungarian graphic designer.
Henry Kolowrat Jr., 87, Czech-born American Olympic fencer (1960).
Rogers Lehew, 92, American football executive (Tulsa Golden Hurricane, Calgary Stampeders).
Ahmed Mghirbi, 74, Tunisian footballer (Stade Tunisien).
Allan Montgomery, 62, Australian footballer (Carlton).
Erhan Önal, 63, Turkish footballer (Bayern Munich, Galatasaray, national team).
Dwite Pedersen, 79, American politician, member of the Nebraska Legislature (1993–2008).
Jeremy Phipps, 78, British Army officer.
David Dias Pimentel, 79, Portuguese Roman Catholic prelate, bishop of São João da Boa Vista (2001–2016), COVID-19.
Borys Rassykhin, 83, Ukrainian football player (Shakhtar Donetsk, Karpaty Lviv) and manager (Karpaty Lviv).
Euclides Scalco, 88, Brazilian pharmacist and politician, deputy (1979–1991) and co-founder of the PSDB, COVID-19.
Sabine Schmitz, 51, German motor racer (Münnich Motorsport) and television presenter (Top Gear), cancer.
Turi Simeti, 91, Italian painter, COVID-19.
Jimmy Stafford, 77, Irish Gaelic footballer (Cavan).
Patrick Viot, 68, French footballer (US Orléans).
Mary Wilburn, 89, American lawyer and government official.
Philip C. Wolf, 64, American travel entrepreneur.
Laurent Zahui, 60, Ivorian footballer (national team).

17
Ed Armbrister, 72, Bahamian baseball player (Cincinnati Reds), complications from diabetes.
Gerhard Augustin, 79, German music producer (Beat-Club), complications from a stroke.
Xosé Ramón Barreiro, 84, Spanish historian, president of the Royal Galician Academy (2001–2009).
Helenês Cândido, 86, Brazilian politician and lawyer, governor of Goiás (1998–1999), COVID-19.
Jacques Frantz, 73, French actor (Asterix and the Vikings, Heartbreaker, Cop au Vin) and voice actor.
Anton Gămurari, 70, Moldovan general (Transnistria War), COVID-19.
Dilipkumar Gandhi, 69, Indian politician, MP (1999–2004, 2009–2019), COVID-19.
Antón García Abril, 87, Spanish composer (Tombs of the Blind Dead, Pancho Villa, Return of the Blind Dead), COVID-19.
Rym Ghezali, 38, Algerian actress (El Wa3ra), cancer.
Kristian Gullichsen, 88, Finnish architect.
Dick Hoyt, 80, American marathon and triathlon runner (Team Hoyt).
Steve Jagielka, 43, English footballer (Shrewsbury Town, Accrington Stanley, Sheffield United).
Amy Johnston, 66, American actress (The Buddy Holly Story, Welcome Back, Kotter, Brothers and Sisters) and drama coach, cancer.
John Magufuli, 61, Tanzanian politician, president (since 2015), minister of works, transports and communications (2000–2005, 2010–2015) and MP (1995–2015).
Freddie Redd, 92, American pianist and composer (The Connection).
Sonny Roberts, 89, Jamaican record producer, throat cancer.
Vicente Rojo Almazán, 89, Spanish-born Mexican painter, graphic designer and sculptor.
Ulisses dos Santos, 91, Brazilian Olympic hurdler (1956), COVID-19.
Ram Swaroop Sharma, 62, Indian politician, MP (since 2014), suicide.
Ian Shelton, 81, Australian footballer (Essendon).
James Smith, 89, American Olympic sport shooter (1956).
Gyula Szersén, 80, Hungarian actor (The Round-Up).

18
Zeev Aram, 89, Romanian-born British furniture designer.
Chester Barnes, 74, English table tennis player and assistant racehorse trainer, heart attack.
Luis Bedoya Reyes, 102, Peruvian politician, mayor of Lima (1964–1969), member of the Constituent Assembly (1978–1980) and minister of justice (1963).
Michael Boardman, 83, English mathematician.
Mark Boguski, 66, American pathologist.
David Braithwaite, 83, New Zealand politician, mayor of Hamilton (2001–2004).
Donald L. Custis, 103, American Navy vice admiral.
Hermann Flaschka, 75, Austrian-American mathematical physicist.
Mehmet Genç, 86, Turkish historian and academic.
Richard Gilliland, 71, American actor (Designing Women, Operation Petticoat, Airplane II: The Sequel).
Herzem Gusmão Pereira, 72, Brazilian politician and journalist, mayor of Vitória da Conquista (since 2017) and Bahia MLA (2015–2016), COVID-19.
Steve Henry, 64, American football player (St. Louis Cardinals, New York Giants, Baltimore Colts), traffic collision.
Bertrand Hourcade, 70, Swiss writer and professor.
Paul Jackson, 73, American jazz bassist (The Headhunters, Azteca, Santana).
Edward Nager, 93, American politician, member of the Wisconsin State Assembly (1962–1974).
Major Olímpio, 58, Brazilian politician, senator (since 2019), deputy (2015–2019) and São Paulo MLA (2007–2015), COVID-19.
Elsa Peretti, 80, Italian jewelry designer, philanthropist, and fashion model.
Picanyol, 73, Spanish comic illustrator (Ot el bruixot).
Jerzy Prokopiuk, 89, Polish philosopher.
Jean-Michel Sanejouand, 86, French artist.
Michael Stolleis, 79, German jurist and historian, director of the Max Planck Society (1991–2009).
Wayne Kent Taylor, 65, American restaurateur, founder and CEO of Texas Roadhouse, suicide.
Skariah Thomas, 77, Indian politician, MP (1977–1984), complications from COVID-19.
John Vincent, 83, British historian.
DeWitt Weaver, 81, American golfer, heart failure.
Bill Young, 74, American football player and coach (Oklahoma State Cowboys).

19
Muhammad Ali al-Sabuni, 91, Syrian Islamic scholar.
Luis Armando Bambarén Gastelumendi, 93, Peruvian Roman Catholic prelate, auxiliary bishop of Lima (1968–1978), bishop of Chimbote (1983–2003) and president of the Episcopal Conference of Peru (1999–2002), COVID-19.
Toby Prince Brigham, 86, American lawyer and eminent domain scholar.
Thomas Cavalier-Smith, 78, English biologist.
Paul Coffin, 78–79, Canadian businessman and convicted fraudster.
Jordi Cornet, 55, Spanish politician, member of the Catalan Parliament (2010–2012) and Barcelona City Council (1995–2010), cancer.
Cristián Cuturrufo, 48, Chilean jazz trumpeter, COVID-19.
Aurelio Desdentado, 76, Spanish judge, member of the Supreme Court (1986–2014), COVID-19.
Margie Evans, 81, American blues and gospel singer and songwriter.
Diana Grenfell, 85, English horticulturist and author.
Andy Haman, 54, American bodybuilder, pulmonary embolism.
Ludwig Heimrath Sr., 86, Canadian racing driver, pancreatic cancer.
Bernard Hugo, 90, French politician, senator (1977–1986), mayor of Trappes (1966–1996).
Henry Wanton Jones, 95, Canadian painter.
Ali Khavari, 97, Iranian politician.
Leonard Kniffel, 73, American librarian, pancreatic cancer.
Melvin L. Kohn, 92, American sociologist.
Irmão Lázaro, 54, Brazilian gospel singer and politician, deputy (2015–2019), COVID-19.
Gary Leib, 65, American cartoonist (Idiotland) and musician (Rubber Rodeo).
Glynn Lunney, 84, American aerospace engineer (Project Mercury, Project Gemini, Apollo program).
Gabriel Milési, 73, French writer and journalist.
Adel Nassief, 58, Egyptian Coptic painter, COVID-19.
Barry Orton, 62, American professional wrestler (WWF, ICW, Stampede Wrestling).
Leonard Sinclair Sparks, 81, Canadian boxer.
Alvin Sykes, 64, American civil rights activist, complications from a spinal injury.
Doug Williams, 75, American anti-polygraph activist.
Budge Wilson, 93, Canadian writer (Before Green Gables, The Metaphor), complications from a fall.

20
Fidelis Atienza, 102, Filipino nun and confectioner.
Kermit Edward Bye, 84, American jurist, judge of the U.S. Court of Appeals for the Eighth Circuit (2000–2016), complications from Alzheimer's disease.
Biagio Ciotto, 91, American politician, member of the Connecticut State Senate (1995–2007).
Lawrence F. Dahl, 91, American chemist.
Albert Joe Demby, 87, Sierra Leonean politician, vice president (1996–1997, 1998–1999, 2000–2002).
Constance Demby, 81, American composer, heart attack.
Buddy Deppenschmidt, 85, American jazz drummer, complications from COVID-19.
Taryn Fiebig, 49, Australian operatic soprano, cancer.
Anton Font, 89, Spanish mime and educator.
Robert Gard, 93, British-born Australian tenor.
Harry Guest, 88, Welsh-born British poet.
Else Hammerich, 84, Danish politician, MEP (1979–1989), cancer.
Robert Hershon, 84, American poet.
Milan Hurtala, 74, Slovak Olympic rower (1968), COVID-19.
Mohamed Ismaïl, 69, Moroccan film director (Goodbye Mothers).
Ford Ivey, 72, American game designer.
Rito Jiménez, 70, Venezuelan politician, deputy (since 2020), COVID-19.
Bernal Jiménez Monge, 91, Costa Rican politician, member (1982–1986, 2002–2006) and president (1984–1985) of the Legislative Assembly, minister of economy and finance (1964–1965).
Fred Jones, 78, Australian rugby league player (Manly Warringah, New South Wales, national team).
Vladimir Kirsanov, 73, Russian choreographer and dancer, Merited Artist of the Russian Federation (1995), COVID-19.
C. A. Kurian, 88, Indian politician, Kerala MLA (1977–1982, 1996–2001).
Richard Lingenfelter, 86, American astrophysicist and historian.
Peter Lorimer, 74, Scottish footballer (Leeds United, national team).
Richard Mendani, 53, Papua New Guinean politician, MP (since 2012), COVID-19.
Chris Nam, 66, South Korean realtor and community leader, liver cancer.
Yevgeny Nesterenko, 83, Russian operatic singer, COVID-19.
François Nicoullaud, 80, French diplomat and political analyst, ambassador to Hungary (1993–1997) and Iran (2001–2005).
Jack Phelan, 95, American basketball player.
Nguyễn Huy Thiệp, 70, Vietnamese writer, complications from a stroke.
Dan Sartain, 39, American rock and roll musician.
Raúl G. Villaronga, 82, American politician, mayor of Killeen, Texas (1992–1998).
Bruce Wilson, 78, Australian Anglican bishop, Bishop of Bathurst (1989–2001), cardiac illness.
Dale E. Wolf, 96, American politician, lieutenant governor (1989–1992) and governor of Delaware (1992–1993).
Fred Wyant, 86, American football player (Washington Redskins, Toronto Argonauts) and official.

21
Akio Arakawa, 93, Japanese-born American climatologist.
José Baselga, 61, Spanish medical oncologist and researcher, Creutzfeldt–Jakob disease.
Gilbert Blardone, 96, French economist and academic.
Pat Collins, 88, American lighting designer (Ain't Misbehavin', I'm Not Rappaport, Dr. Seuss' How the Grinch Stole Christmas! The Musical), Tony winner (1986), pancreatic cancer.
Nawal El Saadawi, 89, Egyptian feminist and writer (Woman at Point Zero, The Fall of the Imam).
Dick Enthoven, 84, Dutch racing cyclist.
Brian Faehse, 96, Australian footballer (West Adelaide).
Jeff Grayshon, 72, English rugby league footballer (Dewsbury, Bradford Northern, Featherstone).
Herbert Gutfreund, 99, British biochemist.
Barbara Hosking, 94, British broadcaster and civil servant.
James W. Hunt, 68, American computer scientist and inventor (Hunt–Szymanski algorithm).
Trisutji Kamal, 84, Indonesian composer.
Teresa Lozano Long, 92, American educator and philanthropist.
Christian Maes, 73, Belgian Olympic sailor (1968).
Sharon Matola, 66, American biologist and environmentalist, founder of the Belize Zoo, heart attack.
Bob McKnight, 83, Canadian ice hockey player, Olympic silver medallist (1960).
Terry Melling, 81, English footballer (Slough Town, Newcastle United, Mansfield Town).
Honoré Ngbanda, 74, Congolese politician, minister of defense (1990–1997).
Sir Stanley Odell, 91, British businessman and politician.
Muchtar Pakpahan, 67, Indonesian lawyer and labor activist.
Jeffrey G. Smith, 99, American lieutenant general.
Suraj Bhanu Solanki, 60, Indian politician, MP (1989–1996), heart attack.
Joel Steiger, 79, American television producer and writer (Perry Mason, Matlock, Jake and the Fatman).
Karin Strenz, 53, German politician, MP (since 2009).
Nicholas Cunliffe-Lister, 3rd Earl of Swinton, 81, British peer.
Xudoyberdi To'xtaboyev, 88, Uzbek children's author.
Shahied Wagid Hosain, 59, Surinamese singer.
Adam Zagajewski, 75, Polish poet (Unseen Hand, Another Beauty).

22
Henrique do Rego Almeida, 84, Brazilian politician, senator (1991–1999), COVID-19.
Luis Arencibia, 74, Spanish sculptor, cancer.
Elgin Baylor, 86, American Hall of Fame basketball player (Minneapolis/Los Angeles Lakers), coach (New Orleans Jazz) and executive (Los Angeles Clippers).
Dušan Čamprag, 96, Serbian entomologist.
Susana Canales, 87, Spanish actress (Black Sky, Such is Madrid, John Paul Jones).
John Crichton-Stuart, 7th Marquess of Bute, 62, Scottish racing driver (Formula One, 24 Hours of Le Mans) and peer, cancer.
Joseph Daaboul, 62, Lebanese poet and proofreader, complications from COVID-19.
Zuhur Dixon, 88, Iraqi poet.
Claudio Donoso, Chilean forester and academic.
Theepetti Ganesan, 30, Indian actor (Renigunta, Kadhal Paathai, Mandya to Mumbai).
Pierick Houdy, 92, French composer and musician.
Floyd Hudlow, 77, American football player (Atlanta Falcons, Buffalo Bills).
Barnabas Imenger, 45, Nigerian footballer (Lobi Stars, national team).
Lorna Irungu, 47, Kenyan television presenter and media relations executive, COVID-19.
Ted Itani, 81, Canadian military officer and humanitarian, complications from injuries sustained in traffic accident.
Swede Knox, 73, Canadian NHL ice hockey linesman, cancer.
Guy Brice Parfait Kolélas, 61, Congolese politician, deputy (since 2007), COVID-19.
Heino Kostabi, 87, Estonian politician.
Melissa Kremer, 25, Dutch writer, leukemia.
Tatyana Lolova, 87, Bulgarian actress (Man of La Mancha, Indian Summer, Opasen char), complications from COVID-19.
Alojzy Łysko, 85, Polish football player and coach.
Tom Magee, 92, Australian footballer (Fitzroy, Melbourne).
Vitaly Margelov, 79, Russian politician and soldier, deputy (2003–2007), COVID-19.
P. J. McGrath, 79, Irish Gaelic football player (Mayo) and referee.
Sante Notarnicola, 82, Italian poet and convicted robber and murderer, complications from influenza.
Peng Shilu, 95, Chinese nuclear engineer (Type 091, Type 092), member of the Chinese Academy of Engineering.
Sagar Sarhadi, 87, Indian screenwriter (Kabhi Kabhie, Noorie, Silsila) and film producer, heart disease.
Alan Slough, 73, English footballer (Luton Town, Fulham, Peterborough United).
Tapeta Tetopata, 67, French Polynesian politician, member of the Assembly (since 2018).
Kotugoda Dhammawasa Thero, 88, Sri Lankan Buddhist monk, Mahanayaka of Amarapura–Rāmañña Nikāya (since 2017).
James M. Wall, 92, American Methodist minister.
Ryszard Wasik, 89, Polish politician, master mariner and diplomat, deputy (1972–1976).
Frank Worthington, 72, English footballer (Huddersfield Town, Leicester City, national team).
May Wynn, 93, American actress (The Caine Mutiny).

23
Gurnam Singh Abulkhurana, 89, Indian politician, Punjab MLA (1992–1997).
Mohammad Anwar, 66, American driver, murdered.
Basrief Arief, 74, Indonesian prosecutor, attorney general (2010–2014).
Noel Bridgeman, 74, Irish musician.
Corinne Chapelle, 44, French-American violinist, cancer.
Alberto Ciurana, 60, Mexican television producer (Televisa, TV Azteca), COVID-19.
Cockney Rebel, 17, Irish thoroughbred racehorse and sire.
Benny Dees, 86, American college basketball coach (Wyoming Cowboys, New Orleans Privateers, Western Carolina Catamounts).
Jehan Desanges, 91, French historian and philologist.
Sam Frazier Jr., 77, American blues musician.
Ethel Gabriel, 99, American record producer (RCA Victor) and music executive, Grammy winner (1982).
William A. Gamson, 87, American sociologist.
Edmund Gettier, 93, American philosopher, complications from a fall.
Tony Greaves, Baron Greaves, 78, British politician and peer, member of the House of Lords (since 2000).
Bashir Ahmed Halepoto, Pakistani politician, Sindh MPA (2013–2018).
Hana Hegerová, 89, Slovak singer and actress (Frona, If a Thousand Clarinets, Shameless), complications from a broken neck.
Mark Jansen, 61, American politician, member of the Michigan House of Representatives (1997–2002) and Senate (2007–2014), brain cancer.
A. Mohammed John, 72, Indian politician, MP (since 2016) and Tamil Nadu MLA (2011–2014), cardiac arrest.
Anne Kerylen, 77, French dubber and actress (I Am Frigid... Why?).
Bob Lewis, 76, American amateur golfer, lung cancer.
Yevgeny Morozov, 92, Russian Olympic rower (1952).
Jesús Gervasio Pérez Rodríguez, 84, Spanish-born Bolivian Roman Catholic prelate, archbishop of Sucre (1985–2021).
Metod Pirih, 84, Slovenian Roman Catholic prelate, bishop of Koper (1987–2012).
Julie Pomagalski, 40, French Olympic snowboarder (2002, 2006), world champion (1999), avalanche.
Reg Poole, 79, Australian footballer (Hawthorn).
John Ridpath, 84, Canadian intellectual historian.
Gilles Rossignol, French writer and editor.
George Segal, 87, American actor (Who's Afraid of Virginia Woolf?, The Goldbergs, A Touch of Class), complications from bypass surgery.
Hans Standl, 95, German Olympic sports shooter (1968).
Erik Thorsby, 82, Norwegian physician.
Houston Tumlin, 28, American child actor (Talladega Nights: The Ballad of Ricky Bobby), suicide by gunshot.
Alhaj Shamim Uddin, 90, Pakistani politician, Sindh MPA (1985–1988).
Joe Vancisin, 98, American basketball coach and executive.
Irena Vrkljan, 90, Croatian writer and translator.
Granville Waiters, 60, American basketball player (Indiana Pacers, Houston Rockets, Chicago Bulls).

24
Alex Andjelic, 80, Serbian Olympic ice hockey player (1964) and coach, complications from COVID-19.
Jean Baudlot, 74, French composer.
Uldis Bērziņš, 76, Latvian poet and translator.
Aécio de Borba, 89, Brazilian politician, deputy (1983–1995, 1997–1998) and member of the Constituent Assembly (1987–1988), cardiac arrest.
Enrique Chazarreta, 73, Argentine footballer (San Lorenzo, Avignon, national team).
Edward B. Cottingham, 92, American judge and politician, member of the South Carolina House of Representatives (1955–1958, 1967–1972).
Morris Dickstein, 81, American literary scholar, complications from Parkinson's disease.
Jesús Fernández Vaquero, 67, Spanish politician, president (2015–2019) and member of the Cortes of Castilla–La Mancha (1999–2019), senator (since 2019).
Finian's Rainbow, 18, British racehorse.
Craig Grant, 52, American actor (Oz, She's Gotta Have It, Good Time) and poet, complications from diabetes.
Derek Hawksworth, 93, English footballer (Bradford City, Sheffield United, Huddersfield Town).
Don Heffington, 70, American drummer (Lone Justice, Watkins Family Hour), leukemia.
Rudolf Kelterborn, 89, Swiss composer (Der Kirschgarten).
Norm Kirby, 95, Canadian soldier (World War II).
Toshihiko Koga, 53, Japanese judoka, Olympic champion (1992).
Anna Koźmińska, 101, Polish recipient of Righteous Among the Nations award.
Kentaro Kudo, 78, Japanese politician, member of the House of Councillors (2004–2010) and House of Representatives (1993–1996, 2000–2003), respiratory failure.
Camille Liénard, 86, Belgian Olympic bobsledder (1964).
Haroldo Lima, 81, Brazilian politician and anti-dictatorship activist, general director of the ANP (2005–2011) and deputy (1983–2003), COVID-19.
Kåre Arnstein Lye, 81, Norwegian botanist and field biologist.
Hanna Lypkivska, 53, Ukrainian theatrologist, COVID-19.
Hamdan bin Rashid Al Maktoum, 75, Emirati politician and horse breeder (Shadwell Racing), deputy prime minister (1971–1973).
Tony Martin, 83, American painter and sculptor, congestive heart failure.
Enrique Martínez, 90, Spanish Olympic equestrian (1960, 1964, 1972).
Jorge Martínez Reverte, 72, Spanish writer, journalist and historian, cancer.
Pedro Saúl Morales, 61, Colombian racing cyclist, heart attack.
Ezra T. Newman, 91, American physicist.
Bob Plager, 78, Canadian ice hockey player (St. Louis Blues, New York Rangers), traffic collision.
Zora Plešnar, 95, Slovenian photographer.
Richard Stoker, 82, British composer and actor.
Tamás Sudár, 79, Hungarian Olympic ski jumper (1960).
Kunie Tanaka, 88, Japanese actor (The Bad Sleep Well, Sanjuro, Battles Without Honor and Humanity).
Vlasta Velisavljević, 94, Serbian actor, COVID-19.
Jessica Walter, 80, American actress (Arrested Development, Archer, Play Misty for Me), Emmy winner (1975).
Mahmoud al-Werfalli, 43, Libyan military officer, shot.
Paul W. Whear, 95, American composer and music educator.
Martin Woollacott, 81, British journalist.
Inger-Marie Ytterhorn, 79, Norwegian politician, MP (1989–1993), member of the Norwegian Nobel Committee (2000–2017).

25
Rais Abin, 94, Indonesian military officer and diplomat, commander of UNEF II (1976–1979).
Stan Albeck, 89, American basketball coach (San Antonio Spurs, New Jersey Nets, Bradley Braves).
Rick Azar, 91, American broadcaster (WKBW-TV).
Bill Brock, 90, American politician, member of the U.S. House of Representatives (1963–1971), senator (1971–1977), and secretary of labor (1985–1987).
Bobby Brown, 96, American baseball player (New York Yankees) and executive, president of the American League (1984–1994).
Chuck Burger, 84, American bridge player.
Gladys Castillo, 98, Venezuelan pediatrician, first lady (1984–1988).
Zakaria Khan Chowdhury, 87, Bangladeshi politician, MP (1996).
Beverly Cleary, 104, American children's author (The Mouse and the Motorcycle, Ramona, Dear Mr. Henshaw), Newbery Medal winner (1984).
Joe Cunningham, 89, American baseball player (St. Louis Cardinals, Chicago White Sox, Washington Senators).
Manuel Dammert, 72, Peruvian sociologist and politician, member of Congress (1985–1992, 2013–2019), COVID-19.
Syarwan Hamid, 77, Indonesian military officer and politician, minister of home affairs (1998–1999).
Tom Hilgendorf, 79, American baseball player (St. Louis Cardinals, Cleveland Indians, Philadelphia Phillies).
Gil Jouanard, 83, French writer.
Aleksandr Lipnitsky, 68, Russian musician (Zvuki Mu), drowned.
Richard Marsina, 97, Slovak historian.
Larry McMurtry, 84, American novelist and screenwriter (Lonesome Dove, The Last Picture Show, Brokeback Mountain), Oscar winner (2006), heart failure.
Larry Melancon, 65, American jockey.
Roman Micał, 82, Polish Olympic hockey player (1960).
Kanwal Naseer, 78, Pakistani news presenter.
WAG Pinto, 96, Indian military officer, commandant of the National Defence College (1979–1980).
Gail Phillips, 76, American politician, member (1991–2001) and speaker (1995–1999) of the Alaska House of Representatives.
Jim Quaid, 88, Irish hurler.
Uta Ranke-Heinemann, 93, German theologian, academic and author (Eunuchs for the Kingdom of Heaven).
Robert Rodan, 83, American actor (Dark Shadows), heart failure.
Arbi Sanit, 81, Indonesian political scientist.
Bi Sidi Souleymane, 58, Central African militant, leader of Return, Reclamation, Rehabilitation (since 2015), complications from gunshot wounds.
Nazar Suyunov, 84, Turkmen politician, minister of foreign affairs (1979–1985).
Randy Tate, 68, American baseball player (New York Mets), complications from COVID-19.
Bertrand Tavernier, 79, French film director (A Sunday in the Country, Coup de Torchon, Life and Nothing But) and screenwriter.
Miha Tišler, 94, Slovenian chemist.
Jan Waszkiewicz, 76, Polish politician, COVID-19.
Kenneth G. Wiman, 90, American rear admiral.

26
Želimir Altarac Čičak, 73, Bosnian music promoter, publicist and poet, COVID-19.
Pandula Andagama, 82, Sri Lankan anthropologist, historian and academic.
Rateb Al-Awadat, 50, Jordanian football player (Al-Faisaly, national team) and manager (Al-Sheikh Hussein), cancer.
Elaine Baxter, 88, American politician, Iowa secretary of state (1987–1995).
Mike Bell, 46, American baseball player (Cincinnati Reds) and coach (Minnesota Twins), kidney cancer.
Cornelia Catangă, 63, Romanian singer, COVID-19.
Kamalesh Chandra Chakrabarty, 68, Indian banker, deputy governor of the Reserve Bank of India (2009–2014), heart attack.
Mary Rawlinson Creason, 96, American aviator.
John Richard Davey, 63, British-born Australian cricketer (South Australia).
Anil Dharker, 73, Indian journalist and writer, heart disease.
František Hajnovič, 71, Slovak economist, minister of finance (2002).
Ursula Happe, 94, German swimmer, Olympic champion (1956).
Piet Hartman, 98, Dutch crystallographer.
Nabindra Raj Joshi, 57, Nepalese politician, minister of industry (2016–2017), MP (since 2008) and deputy mayor of Kathmandu (1992–1997), stroke.
Hossein Khodaparast, 82, Iranian Olympic footballer (1964).
Orest Kryvoruchko, 78, Ukrainian artist.
Lennart Larsson, 91, Swedish cross country skier, Olympic bronze medalist (1956).
Carole Lavallée, 67, Canadian politician, MP (2004–2011).
Rod McKie, 63, British cartoonist (Punch, The Wall Street Journal, Harvard Business Review), brain hemorrhage.
Vili Milisits, 72, Australian pastry chef and businessman.
Haseena Moin, 79, Pakistani screenwriter (Tanhaiyaan, Dhoop Kinare, Shehzori), cancer.
Azade Namdari, 36, Iranian actress and television host, suicide.
Surinder Singh Nijjar, 71, Indian jurist, judge of the Supreme Court (2009–2014) and chief justice of the Calcutta High Court (2007–2009), cardiac arrest.
Bartomeu Planells, 71, Spanish furniture executive and politician, member of the Balearic Islands Parliament (1987–1991), cancer.
Paul Polansky, 79, American writer and Romani activist.
Tadashi Sawamura, 78, Japanese kickboxer.
Shen Shanjiong, 103, Chinese microbiologist and geneticist, member of the Chinese Academy of Sciences.
Pete Smith, 76, British Olympic cyclist (1968), injuries sustained in bicycle accident.
Enzo Spaltro, 92, Italian psychologist.
Louis St. Louis, 78, American songwriter (Grease).
Elizabeth Thabethe, 61, South African politician, MP (since 1994), complications from a traffic collision.
Ilie Vancea, 72, Moldovan politician, minister of education (2000–2002).
Saâdeddine Zmerli, 91, Tunisian urologist and politician, minister of health (1988–1989).

27
Sir Roy Austen-Smith, 96, British air marshal.
Bill Diessner, 97, American politician, member of the Minnesota Senate (1983–1990).
Nancy Dillow, 92, Canadian museum curator.
Peter Fox, 61, Australian-born American computer scientist.
Zafir Hadžimanov, 77, Macedonian-Serbian singer and actor, COVID-19.
Leon Hale, 99, American journalist and author (Houston Chronicle, Houston Post).
Redha Hamiani, 76, Algerian politician, minister for small business (1995).
Charles Hill, 84, American diplomat and author.
Todd Kabel, 55, Canadian jockey, Sovereign Award for Outstanding Jockey (1992, 1995, 2003–2006).
Petr Kellner, 56, Czech financier and investment executive, founder of PPF, helicopter crash.
Alex Kiddie, 93, Scottish footballer (Aberdeen).
Barry King, 76, British Olympic decathlete (1972).
Mary Jeanne Kreek, 84, American neurobiologist.
Richard Loving, 97, Austrian-born American artist.
Keith MacDonald, 93, Canadian politician, Ontario MPP (1987–1990).
Graham Dunstan Martin, 88, British author (The Soul Master, Time-Slip, The Dream Wall).
Gideon J. Mellenbergh, 82, Dutch psychologist.
James R. Mills, 93, American politician, member (1961–1982) and president pro tempore (1970–1980) of the California State Senate, kidney cancer.
Eugenio Mimica Barassi, 71, Chilean writer, member of the Chilean Language Academy (since 2014).
Patrick O'Malley, 77, Irish politician. TD (1987–1989).
Odirlei Pessoni, 38, Brazilian Olympic bobsledder (2014, 2018), traffic collision.
Mahbubur Rahman, 81, Bangladeshi politician, minister of education (1986–1988) and religious affairs (1984–1987).
Antonio Sanchez, 71, Filipino politician and convicted murderer, mayor of Calauan (1980–1986, 1988–1993).
Howard Schnellenberger, 87, American football coach (Miami Hurricanes, Louisville Cardinals, Florida Atlantic Owls), national championship winner (1983).
Paulo Stein, 73, Brazilian journalist and sports announcer, COVID-19.
Derek Ufton, 92, English cricketer (Kent) and footballer (Charlton Athletic, national team).
Sarah Whitmore, 89, British Olympic equestrian (1976).
Aleksandr Yevteyev, 68, Russian military officer.
Xie Yuyuan, 96, Chinese pharmaceutical chemist, member of the Chinese Academy of Sciences.
Mohammad Yunus, 76, Bangladeshi politician, MP (1973–1976, 1986–1990, 2001–2006).
Jai Zharotia, 74–75, Indian painter and artist, cardiac arrest.

28
Malcolm Cecil, 84, British musician (Tonto's Expanding Head Band, Blues Incorporated) and record producer (Talking Book).
Gianluigi Colalucci, 91, Italian conservator-restorer (Restoration of the Sistine Chapel frescoes).
Joseph Edward Duncan, 58, American serial killer, glioblastoma.
Marisa Ferretti Barth, 89, Italian-born Canadian politician, senator (1997–2006).
Halyna Hai, 64, Ukrainian poet and writer, COVID-19.
Jean-Pierre Hébert, 81, French-American artist.
Christof Heyns, 62, South African human rights lawyer.
Louise Horne, 108, Trinidadian politician and nutritionist, senator (1976–1991).
David Kantor, 93, American systems psychologist, complications from a stroke.
Juventino Kestering, 74, Brazilian Roman Catholic prelate, bishop of Rondonópolis-Guiratinga (2014–2021).
Karen Kleven, 95, Norwegian politician, deputy MP (1973–1981).
Jean Langenheim, 95, American plant ecologist.
Liu Kai-chi, 67, Hong Kong actor (Cageman, Infernal Affairs II, SPL: Sha Po Lang), stomach cancer.
Xabier Markiegi, 82, Spanish politician, member of the Basque Parliament (1981–1994).
Neil Merryweather, 75, Canadian musician, brain tumor.
Mel Pinto, 97, Moroccan-born American bicycle importer.
Didier Ratsiraka, 84, Malagasy politician, president (1975–1993, 1997–2002), cardiac arrest.
Kjell Risvik, 79, Norwegian translator.
Michelle Ross, 66, Jamaican-born Canadian drag entertainer.
Bobby Schmautz, 76, Canadian ice hockey player (Boston Bruins, Vancouver Canucks, Chicago Blackhawks), pancreatic cancer.
Constantin Simirad, 79, Romanian politician, mayor of Iași (1992–2003) and diplomat, ambassador to Cuba (2003–2006), COVID-19.
Enrico Vaime, 85, Italian television and radio presenter, author and playwright.
Géza Varga, 74, Hungarian agrarian manager and politician, MP (2010–2014).
Neil Windsor, 75, Canadian politician, Newfoundland and Labrador MHA (1975–1995).

29
Constantin Brodzki, 96, Belgian architect.
Carlos Busqued, 50, Argentine writer, radio producer, and engineer.
Claude Callegari, 58, English football fan and YouTube personality.
Antonio Caro, 71, Colombian conceptual artist, heart failure.
Saverio De Michele, 97, Italian businessman and politician, mayor of Olbia (1956–1963).
Bashkim Fino, 58, Albanian politician, prime minister (1997), deputy prime minister (1997–1998) and deputy (since 1997), COVID-19.
Bob Houmard, 74, American football player (Winnipeg Blue Bombers, Ottawa Rough Riders).
Elaine Hugh-Jones, 93, Welsh pianist and composer.
Theodore Lambrinos, 85, Greek-American opera singer, complications from COVID-19.
Bibian Mentel, 48, Dutch snowboarder, Paralympic champion (2014, 2018), cancer.
Sarah Onyango Obama, 99, Kenyan educator and philanthropist, complications from diabetes and a stroke.
Robert Opron, 89, French automotive designer, COVID-19.
Park Kyung-ho, 91, South Korean football player (national team) and manager, Asian Games silver medallist (1958).
Ferdinand Schladen, 81, German shot putter.
David A. Shirley, 86, American chemist.
Surendra Sirsat, 75, Indian politician, Goa MLA (1977–1980, 1989–1999), liver disease.
L. Dennis Smith, 83, American embryologist and academic administrator, president of the University of Nebraska system (1994–2004).
Elwood Thorpe, 92, American politician, member of the North Dakota House of Representatives (1991–1993, 1997–2010).
Adam Toledo, 13, American teenager, shot.

30
Nazar Albaryan, 77, Armenian Olympic wrestler (1968). (death announced on this date)
Maria Bofill, 83–84, Spanish potter, COVID-19.
Jean Bourlès, 90, French racing cyclist.
Vincent Brümmer, 88, South African-Dutch philosopher and theologian.
Contardo Calligaris, 72, Italian-Brazilian psychoanalyst and writer, cancer.
Enrico Clementi, 89, Italian chemist, kidney infection.
Josefina Cuesta, 74, Spanish historian and academic.
Gérard Filippelli, 78, French actor (Bons Baisers de Hong Kong, The Big Store), musician and composer (Les Charlots).
Myra Frances, 78, British actress (Doctor Who), cancer.
Claire dela Fuente, 62, Filipino singer, cardiac arrest.
Dhananjay Jadhav, 74, Indian police officer, Mumbai police commissioner (2007–2008), heart disease.
Guy Lelièvre, 69, Canadian politician, Quebec MNA (1994–2008).
G. Gordon Liddy, 90, American FBI agent, convicted criminal (Watergate scandal) and radio host.
Khaya Makina, 56, South African military leader. (death announced on this date)
Germán Medina Triviño, Colombian politician, governor of Caquetá Department (2010–2011), shot.
Maurizio Moretti, 76, Italian footballer (S.P.A.L.), COVID-19.
Carlo Mosca, 75, Italian prefect and magistrate, pneumonia.
Patrick O. O'Meara, 83, South African-born American educator and author.
Francis Otunta, 62, Nigerian mathematician and academic administrator, vice-chancellor of Michael Okpara University of Agriculture (2016–2021), traffic collision.
Evelyn Sakash, 66, American production designer (Mermaids), heart disease. (body discovered on this date)
Chuck Schilling, 83, American baseball player (Boston Red Sox).
Ferenc Somogyi, 75, Hungarian politician, foreign minister (2004–2006), ambassador to the United States (2007–2009).
Tony Turner, 88, British Olympic diver (1952).
Alex Woo, 47, American jewelry designer, cancer.

31
Jean-Christophe Balouet, 64, French paleontologist and forensic scientist, stroke.
Angelo Bertoni, 87, Australian politician, Queensland MLA (1974–1983).
Alice Butler-Short, 77, Irish-American political activist and campaigner.
Tamara Chikunova, 72, Uzbek human rights activist.
Lee Collins, 32, English footballer (Port Vale, Northampton Town, Mansfield Town), suicide by hanging.
Richard Coren, 66, American bridge player, Crohn's disease.
Anzor Erkomaishvili, 80, Georgian composer and musician (Rustavi Ensemble), MP (2008–2009), COVID-19.
Paul Feinman, 61, American lawyer and jurist, associate judge of the New York Court of Appeals (since 2017).
Kamal Ganzouri, 88, Egyptian politician, prime minister (1996–1999, 2011–2012).
Ron Greene, 82, American college basketball coach (Mississippi State, Murray State, Indiana State).
Cleve Hall, 61, American special effects artist (Metalstorm: The Destruction of Jared-Syn, Alienator), make-up artist and actor.
Hsu Shui-teh, 89, Taiwanese politician, minister of the interior (1988–1991), president of the Examination Yuan (1996–2002), and mayor of Taipei (1985–1988), pneumonia.
Ivan Klajn, 84, Serbian linguist, philologist and language historian, COVID-19.
Diede Lameiro, 87, Brazilian football manager (Ferroviária, São Paulo, Palmeiras).
Li Jingwen, 88, Chinese economist, member of the Chinese Academy of Engineering and the Chinese Academy of Social Sciences.
Jane Manning, 82, English operatic soprano.
Lee Marmon, 95, American Laguna Pueblo photographer and author.
Jerry McGee, 77, American golfer.
Mary Mullarkey, 77, American jurist, justice (1987–2010) and chief justice (1998–2010) of the Colorado Supreme Court, multiple sclerosis.
Pedro Nel Gil, 93, Colombian road racing cyclist.
Ivair Nogueira do Pinho, 69, Brazilian politician, Minas Gerais MLA (1995–2011) and mayor of Betim (1991–1992), COVID-19.
Kjellaug Nordsjö, 94, Swedish-Norwegian icon painter.
Climent Palmitjavila, 80, Andorran politician, member of the General Council (1986–1992).
Koinange Paul, 72, Kenyan politician, MP (since 2013), COVID-19.
Erwin Piechowiak, 84, German footballer (HSV).
Valerie Pitts, 83, British television presenter (Play School).
Ken Reitz, 69, American baseball player (St. Louis Cardinals, San Francisco Giants, Pittsburgh Pirates).
Winfred Rembert, 75, American artist.
Khwaja Saeed Hai, 91, Pakistani tennis player.
Thomas Saisi, 75, Kenyan Olympic runner (1968, 1972).
Gregory K. Scott, 72, American jurist, justice of the Colorado Supreme Court (1993–2000).
Mike Sensibaugh, 72, American football player (Kansas City Chiefs, St. Louis Cardinals).
Izabella Sierakowska, 74, Polish politician, deputy (1989–2005, 2007–2011).
Fabriciano Sigampa, 84, Argentine Roman Catholic prelate, archbishop of Resistencia (2005–2013), bishop of La Rioja (1992–2005) and Reconquista (1985–1992).
Jean-Pierre Tafunga Mbayo, 78, Congolese Roman Catholic prelate, bishop of Kilwa–Kasenga (1992–2002) and Uvira (2002–2008), archbishop of Lubumbashi (since 2010).
Arkady Ter-Tadevosyan, 81, Armenian major general.
Muhammad Wakkas, 69, Bangladeshi politician, MP (1986–1991, 2001–2006).
Jadwiga Wysoczanská, 93, Czech opera singer (National Theatre soloist).
Carlos Pedro Zilli, 66, Brazilian-born Bissau-Guinean Roman Catholic prelate, bishop of Bafatá (since 2001), COVID-19.
Stefano Zuccherini, 67, Italian politician, senator (2006–2008).

References 

2021-03
 03